The Indian Chemical Society is a scientific society dedicated in the field of chemistry from India.  It was established in 1924 with Prafulla Chandra Ray as its founding president. The same year the society started to publish its "Quarterly Journal of Indian Chemical Society" (1924– 1927) which is currently known as Journal of Indian Chemical Society.

Fellows

Animesh Chakravorty

Indian Chemical Society – North Branch

To serve more efficiently towards the scientific objective of the society, on the 3rd day of March 2020 ICS has launched the Indian Chemical Society – North Branch. Prof. Jatinder K Ratan is the President and Dr. Shivendu Ranjan as Vice President of ICS-North Branch. ICS-North branch has Prof. Vickram Jeet Singh as Secretary and Dr. Nandita Dasgupta  as Joint Secretary.

References

Chemistry societies
Scientific organisations based in India
Scientific organizations established in 1924
1924 establishments in British India